In probability theory and statistics, the Jensen–Shannon divergence is a method of measuring the similarity between two probability distributions.  It is also known as information radius (IRad)  or total divergence to the average. It is based on the Kullback–Leibler divergence, with some notable (and useful) differences, including that it is symmetric and it always has a finite value. The square root of the Jensen–Shannon divergence is a metric often referred to as Jensen–Shannon distance.

Definition
Consider the set  of probability distributions where  is a set provided with some σ-algebra of measurable subsets. In particular we can take  to be a finite or countable set with all subsets being measurable.

The Jensen–Shannon divergence (JSD)  is a symmetrized and smoothed version of the Kullback–Leibler divergence . It is defined by

where .

The geometric Jensen–Shannon divergence (or G-Jensen–Shannon divergence) yields a closed-form formula for divergence between two Gaussian distributions by taking the geometric mean.

A more general definition, allowing for the comparison of more than two probability distributions, is:

where 

For the two-distribution case described above,

Hence, for those distributions

Bounds
The Jensen–Shannon divergence is bounded by 1 for two probability distributions, given that one uses the base 2 logarithm.

With this normalization, it is a lower bound on the total variation distance between P and Q:

In general, the bound in base b is :

Relation to mutual information 
Let  be some abstract function on the underlying set of events that discriminates well between events, and choose the value of  according to  if  and according to   if , where  is equiprobable. That is, we are choosing  according to the probability measure  , and its distribution is the mixture distribution. We compute 

One can apply the same principle to a joint distribution and the product of its two marginal distribution (in analogy to Kullback–Leibler divergence and mutual information) and to measure how reliably one can decide if a given response comes from the joint distribution or the product distribution—subject to the assumption that these are the only two possibilities.

Quantum Jensen–Shannon divergence
The generalization of probability distributions on density matrices allows to define quantum Jensen–Shannon divergence (QJSD). It is defined for a set of density matrices  and a probability distribution  as

This quantity was introduced in quantum information theory, where it is called the Holevo information: it gives the upper bound for amount of classical information encoded by the quantum states  under the prior distribution  (see Holevo's theorem). It is a square of a metric for pure states, and it was recently shown that this metric property holds for mixed states as well. The Bures metric is closely related to the quantum JS divergence; it is the quantum analog of the Fisher information metric.

Jensen–Shannon centroid

The centroid C* of a finite set of probability distributions can 
be defined as the minimizer of the average sum of the Jensen-Shannon divergences between a probability distribution  and the prescribed set of distributions:

An efficient algorithm (CCCP) based on difference of convex functions is reported to calculate the Jensen-Shannon centroid of a set of discrete distributions (histograms).

Applications
The Jensen–Shannon divergence has been applied in bioinformatics and genome comparison, in protein surface comparison, in the social sciences, in the quantitative study of history,, fire experiments  and in machine learning.

Notes

External links
 Ruby gem for calculating JS divergence
 Python code for calculating JS divergence
 THOTH: a python package for the efficient estimation of information-theoretic quantities from empirical data
 statcomp R library for calculating complexity measures including Jensen-Shannon Divergence

Statistical distance